Hellenic Train Class 120, also known as Hellas Sprinter, is a class of electric locomotives operated by Hellenic Train. It is part of OSE's rolling stock. They were manufactured by Siemens and Krauss-Maffei in Germany.

They are equipped with electric motors with a total power of 5000 kW and have been used in both passenger and freight trains on the Greek railways since 1999. It was the first and is currently the only class of fully electric locomotives of the Hellenic Railway Network and the main locomotives used between Athens and Thessaloniki. There are two other types of electric trains in the National Rail Network of Greece, the Siemens Desiro EMU (460 series) and the ΕΤR 470 (in service since 2022).

Origins 
The HellasSprinter, strongly resembles the first generation EuroSprinter (and therefore is considered as such by many), a series of electric locomotives that also operated on the DB AG, RENFE (Serie 252) and CP (Serie 5600) networks.

In 1993, with the proclamation 2002/93, the Hellenic Railways Organization (OSE) held a tender for the supply of thermal and electrical locomotives, in the general context of the modernization of the normal amplitude network, and in the middle of a program for the renewal of engines, due to operating problems of its diverse and aging fleet. The collection included 25 diesel-electric locomotives, which constituted the series A.471 (Later 220) and 6 electric locomotives. The diesel locomotives have a continuous power of 2100 kW, while the electric ones 5000 kW. OSE's goal was low maintenance costs, low fuel / electricity consumption, line protection, heating of passenger trains, execution of commercial and passenger trains at a speed of 160 km / h for diesels and 200 for the electrics and the convertibility of diesels to electrics. The winners of the competition were Siemens and Krauss-Maffei for the electrics and ABB Henschel AG (later ADtranz, now Bombardier) for the diesels.

In service 
The construction of the first unit was completed in 1997 and as soon as it completed its trials in Germany, it came to Greece, to be routed on the electrified line Thessaloniki - Eidomeni - Gevgelija. Another 5 units followed, and along with CFR 060-EA1-056, an electric locomotive leased from Romania, they began their service in 1998 on the said route, primarily hauling cross-border traffic into North Macedonia. Their locale extended between 2009 and 2018 towards Larissa, Domokos and eventually Athens and Piraeus. A follow-up order was delivered between 2004 and 2005, save for 120 008 which for unexplained reasons had stayed in Munich at the Siemens-Krauss Maffei workshops up to 2007, before entering service in 2008.

In 2019, with the completion of the new Piraeus-Platy line and the units being used on all Athens-Thessaloniki trains, some locomotives were painted with the new dark blue livery of TRAINOSE.  At the same time, in the same year, GAIAOSE announced the renovation of 120 001, 120 002, 120 003, 120 005, 120 006, 120 009, 120 013, 120 025 and 120 026.

Accidents
 Sometime in 2000, unit Η564 derailed in the Paionia municipality on the Thessaloniki-Gevgelija line. Not much is known about the details of the accident but since then the unit has been placed into storage due to light accident damage.
 On 28 February 2023, three units (120 022, 120 012, 120 023) were destroyed in a head-on collision near Evangelismos, Larissa just outside the Tempe Valley, in a train accident that led to the deaths of 57 people and left over 85 people injured. 120 023 was hauling an Athens to Thessaloniki InterCity train at an speed estimated to be around 140 km/h when it collided with 120 012 and 120 022 hauling an intermodal train.

Fleet details 

List as per 1 March 2023, note it might contain some errors.

Galery of liveries

See also

 EuroSprinter

References

Electric locomotives of Greece
120
Bo′Bo′ locomotives
Siemens locomotives
25 kV AC locomotives
Standard gauge locomotives of Greece
Railway locomotives introduced in 1997